Every Turn of the World is the third studio album by Christopher Cross, recorded and released in 1985. The album is notable for its harder rocking sound, lacking the pop ballads that dominated the sound of previous albums. Though the album itself peaked at No. 127 on the Billboard 200, the only single from the album to chart, "Charm the Snake", peaked only at No. 68 on the Billboard Hot 100. The other two singles from the album, the title track and "Love Is Love (In Any Language)", failed to chart.

Track listing 

"Every Turn of the World" (Christopher Cross, Michael Omartian, John Bettis) - 4:02
"Charm the Snake" (Christopher Cross, Michael Omartian) - 4:24
"I Hear You Call" (Christopher Cross, Michael Omartian, John Bettis) - 3:41
"Don't Say Goodbye" (Christopher Cross, Billy Alessi, John Bettis) - 3:32
"It's You That Really Matters" (Christopher Cross, Will Jennings) - 3:59
"Love Is Love (In Any Language)" (Christopher Cross, Michael Omartian, John Bettis) - 4:27
"Swing Street" (Christopher Cross, Michael Omartian, Will Jennings) - 4:14
"Love Found a Home" (Christopher Cross) - 3:29
"That Girl" (Christopher Cross, John Bettis) - 3:28
"Open Your Heart" (Christopher Cross, Will Jennings) - 5:39

Personnel 
 Christopher Cross – vocals, guitars, SynthAxe
 Michael Omartian – keyboards, synthesizers, horn arrangements
 Marcus Ryle – synthesizer programming
 Joe Chemay – bass guitar
 John Robinson – drums
 Paulinho da Costa – congas (1)
 Gary Herbig – saxophones, sax solo (7, 10)
 Kim Hutchcroft – saxophones
 Chuck Findley – trumpet
 Jerry Hey – trumpet 
 Gary Grant – trumpet
 Alexandra Brown – backing vocals 
 Lynn Davis – backing vocals 
 Khalig Glover – backing vocals
 Portia Griffin – backing vocals
 Richard Marx – backing vocals
 Vesta Williams – backing vocals

Production 
 Producer – Michael Omartian
 Production Coordination – James Wofford
 Engineer and Mixing – John Guess
 Assistant Engineer – Mark Linett
 Second Engineers – Tom Fouce, Laura Livingston, and James Wofford.
 Recorded and Mixed at Lion Share Recording Studios (Los Angeles, CA).
 Additional recording at Pop 'N' Roll Studios (Santa Monica, CA).
 Mastered by Steve Hall at Future Disc (Hollywood, CA).
 Art Direction and Design – Jen McManus and Laura LiPuma
 Logo Design – Margo Chase
 Photography – Steve Sakai
 Linguistics Advisor – John Accomando

References

1985 albums
Christopher Cross albums
Albums produced by Michael Omartian
Warner Records albums